The Bolivarian Army of Trolls is a state-sponsored Internet propaganda agency of Venezuela. It is a child agency of the Ministry of Interior, Justice and Peace that is tasked with spreading Bolivarian propaganda throughout the internet.

History
In May 2017, documents from the Ministry of Interior, Justice and Peace leaked surrounding the foundation of the Bolivarian Army of Trolls. The Army of Trolls was created to reinforce a militaristic mindset among its members, a defining characteristic of the Bolivarian government.

Organization 
The Army of Trolls is organized in a military-like structure which includes:

 Squad – An individual responsible for twenty-three social media accounts
 Platoon – Ten squads separated into groups of two, placed in task forces involving press, design, hacking, account incubation and disinformation, a total of 230 social media accounts
 Company – Fifty individuals made of five platoons, a total of 1,150 social media accounts
 Battalion – One-hundred individuals made of two companies, a total of 2,300 social media accounts
 Brigade – Five-hundred individuals made of five battalions, a total of 11,500 social media accounts

Functions
Personnel involved are tasked with adopting the personas of accounts that range from being a chavista, an opposition-supporter or a sexual catfish. Trolls are also responsible for spreading disinformation and fake news.

Reception 
Venezuelan NGO Instituto Prensa y Sociedad stated that the Bolivarian Army of Trolls places "journalism, freedom of expression and democracy at risk" and that its creation "extends the surveillance, opacity and censorship status to the internet that the Venezuelan government has increasingly implemented through regulations, agencies and unconstitutional orders".

References

Propaganda in Venezuela
Internet manipulation and propaganda
Disinformation operations
2017 establishments in Venezuela
Internet trolling